This is a list of films which feature the Salvation Army as the subject matter, or as a matter theme in the film.

1900s

1900
Soldiers of the Cross

1902
General Booth

1903
The Chorus Girl and the Salvation Army

1909
The Salvation Army Lass

1910s

1915
 Salvation Nell

1916
A Gutter Magdalene
Salvation Joan

1917
Easy Street

1919
The Belle of New York
The Blue Bonnet
Fires of Faith
The Salvation Army On The Job
Salvation Rose

1920s

1920
Hell's Oasis

1921
The Phantom Carriage ("Körlkaren")
The Big Punch
Salvation Nell

1927
The Angel of Broadway
Salvation Jane

1928
You're Darn Tootin'
Street of Sin

1929
Pandora's Box

1930s

1931
The Public Enemy
Laughing Sinners
Salvation Nell
The Miracle Woman

1933
She Done Him Wrong
Heroes for Sale
Midnight Mary

1935
The 39 Steps

1936
San Francisco

1940s

1941
Major Barbara
Sullivan's Travels

1942
Larceny, Inc.

1943
The Youngest Profession

1946
The Dark Corner

1948
The Time of Your Life 
Good Sam

1950s

1951
A Place in the Sun
On Moonlight Bay

1952
The Belle of New York

1955
Guys and Dolls
The Cockleshell Heroes

1956
The Man Who Never Was

1960s

1961
The Long and the Short and the Tall
Whistle Down the Wind

1962
The Spiral Road

1963
Heavens Above!

1966
The Wrong Box
Penelope

1968
Run, Man, Run!

1970s

1972
Frenzy

1973
O Lucky Man!

1975
Three Days of the Condor

1977
High Anxiety

1978
Hot Lead and Cold Feet

1980s

1983
A Christmas Story

1985
Brazil

1988
Judgment in Berlin

1989
Born on the Fourth of July

1990s

1993
Excessive Force

1994
The Sum of Us

1996
Sleepers

1998
The Book of Life

2000s

2000
Joe the Turk
The William Booth Story

2002
Mies vailla menneisyyttä

2007
Fred Claus

2013
Silver Bells

2015
Do You Believe?

Publications

A book was published by Kinnon Publishing in 2020 which listed all these films and many more - over 520 films with portrayals of the Salvation Army - called "The Salvation Army at the Movies".

Other books on the subject include:

References

External links
 Internet Movie Database list of Salvation Army films
 The Salvation Army at the Movies page on Facebook

 
Salvation Army